Geophorus is a genus of tropical and subtropical land snails with an operculum, terrestrial gastropod mollusks in the family Helicinidae.

Species 
Species within the genus Geophorus include:
 Geophorus acutissima 
 Geophorus agglutinans
 Geophorus lazarus 
 Geophorus oxytropis 
 Geophorus romblonensis 
 Geophorus tagbilleranus 
 Geophorus trochaceus

References 

 ITIS info
 Discoverlife.org info

Helicinidae